Strategemata, or Stratagems, is a Latin work by the Roman author Frontinus (c. 40 – 103 AD). It is a collection of examples of military stratagems from Greek and Roman history, ostensibly for the use of generals.  Frontinus is assumed to have written Strategemata towards the end of the first century AD, possibly in connection with a lost work on military theory.

Frontinus is best known as a writer on water engineering, but he had a distinguished military career. In Stratagems he draws partly on his own experience as a general in Germany under Domitian.  However, most of the (more than five hundred) examples which he gives are less recent, for example he mentions the Siege of Uxellodunum in 51 BC. Similarities to versions in other Roman authors like Valerius Maximus and Livy suggest that he drew mainly on literary sources.

The work consists of four books, of which three are undoubtedly by Frontinus. The authenticity of the fourth book has been challenged.

Editions

References

External sources 
 Strategemata 
 Frontinus: The man and the works (LacusCurtius website): this source provides the Latin text and the English translation from the 1925 Loeb edition.

Latin military books
Military strategy books
1st-century Latin books